Aloha Milkyway (stylized in lowercase as aloha milkyway) is a compilation album from Filipino alternative rock band Eraserheads in 1998. It was released under BMG Records (Pilipinas), Inc. and contains 14 tracks, five of which were new songs recorded for this album, and the rest were remastered versions of songs from their previously released albums. The name of this album is a reference to a song from the previous album which repeatedly says it.

An Asian Edition was also released for this album. In Singapore and all over Asia, the initial pressing for the album at 400 copies was soon sold out at the day of launching. In Indonesia, South Korea, Hong Kong, Taiwan, Japan, & Southeast Asia "Julie Tearjerky" was released as a single, where it reached number 1 in the charts.

Track listing

Notes
"Downtown", "Trip to Jerusalem", and "Ambi Dextrose" are slightly different from their album versions:

 In "Downtown", the sample "Hey whatcha doin'? Going back to killing" before the beginning of the song in the album version was edited out
 In "Trip To Jerusalem", the short hidden track in the album version was edited out
 In "Ambi Dextrose", the sound effect in the album version was edited out

References

1998 greatest hits albums
Bertelsmann Music Group albums
Eraserheads albums